Paige Shand-Haami is a film and television actress.

Career
She appeared as Cass in the television series The New Tomorrow (2005), a sequel to The Tribe television series.  She has also appeared in two films.

Filmography
Water (2004) as Mary
The Tub (2005) as Mary

References

External links

Year of birth missing (living people)
Living people
New Zealand film actresses
New Zealand television actresses